Laranjeiro (Portuguese for field of orange trees) is a former civil parish in the municipality of Almada, Lisbon metropolitan area, Portugal. In 2013, the parish merged into the new parish Laranjeiro e Feijó. The population in 2011 was 20,988, in an area of 3.88 km2.

References

Former parishes of Almada